The Skyline Cup is a women's roller derby trophy traded between New York's Gotham Girls Roller Derby and Chicago's Windy City Rollers as a prize awarded to the victorious team whenever teams from the two leagues directly compete.

Origins 

The trophy was conceived and designed and commissioned by the Windy City Rollers in early 2010, in recognition of a strong intercity rivalry.  The two teams' All-Star squads met in the WFTDA East Region finals in both 2007 and 2008, and in the finals of the WFTDA Championship in 2008.

Each league fields a variety of women's roller derby teams: All-Stars, B-Team, C-Team, and regular home teams.  The two leagues have agreed that the trophy is 'on the line' each time any two teams from the two leagues meet in any full-length regulation public roller derby competition.  The trophy is a symbol of the latest league victory, at any level of competition.

The trophy was initially awarded to Gotham Girls Roller Derby after their All-Stars' June 25, 2010 victory at the East Coast Derby Extravaganza in Feasterville, PA.  The trophy was engraved to retroactively list prior meetings between the teams.

Series History 

 August 19, 2007 - Gotham Girls All-Stars 134, Windy City All-Stars 71

Columbus, OH.  Flat track competition in the finals of the WFTDA's East Region Playoffs

 October 10, 2008 - Gotham Girls All-Stars 133, Windy City All-Stars 92

Madison, WI.  Flat track competition in the finals of the WFTDA's East Region Playoffs

 November 16, 2008 -- Gotham Girls All-Stars 134, Windy City All-Stars 66

Portland, OR.  Flat track competition in the finals of the WFTDA's Championship tournament

 June 25, 2010 - Gotham Girls All-Stars 191, Windy City All-Stars 50

Feasterville, PA.  Flat track competition at the East Coast Derby Extravaganza.

 July 20, 2011 - Windy City Second Wind 166, Gotham Girls Wall Street Traitors 77

Chicago, IL.  Flat track competition at UIC-Pavilion.

 November 19, 2011 - Gotham Girls All-Stars 214, Windy City All-Stars 94

Chicago, IL.  Banked track competition at UIC-Pavilion at the Kitten Traxx Chicago Invitational.

 July 21, 2012 - Gotham Girls All-Stars 254, Windy City All-Stars 89

Austin, TX.  Flat track competition at the Star of Texas Bowl, hosted by the Texas Rollergirls

 October 27, 2012 - Gotham Girls Grand Central Terminators 300, Windy City Third Coast 104

Brooklyn, NY.  Flat track competition at Gotham's practice warehouse.

 October 27, 2012 - Windy City Second Wind 134, Gotham Girls Wall Street Traitors 119

Brooklyn, NY.  Flat track competition at Gotham's practice warehouse.  Note that this was the second bout in a double-header split, so the Windy City Rollers were considered the most recent winner of the cup.

References

External links
 Gotham Girls Roller Derby
 Windy City Rollers

Roller derby in the United States
Roller derby competitions